Excuse Me is a live album by Portuguese singer Salvador Sobral. It was released in Portugal on 15 December 2017 by Edições Valentim de Carvalho. The album peaked at number 4 on the Portuguese Albums Chart.

Background
Sobral found some time while waiting for his heart transplant to put together a few live versions of his songs. On the album cover is a picture of Teatro Garcia de Resende in Évora, Portugal, the first stage he stepped on after winning Festival da Canção. The songs were recorded during his farewell concert in Cascais and his concerts in Centro Cultural de Belém, Casa da Música and Centro Cultural.

Track listing

Charts

Release history

References

2017 albums
Salvador Sobral albums